Ralph Lundsten (born 6 October 1936) is a Swedish composer of electronic music, as well as a film director, artist and author.

He was born and raised in Ersnäs, Norrbotten, in northern Sweden, and now lives in Nacka on the outskirts of Stockholm, still close to the forest and the sea. His home is Castle Frankenburg, a pink wooden mansion dating from 1878 which also houses his electronic music studio, Andromeda Studio.

Since 1959 he has lived an independent life, creating his own personal musical language, and preparing original films and exhibitions. His song Out in the Wide World served as the interval signal for Radio Sweden International's shortwave broadcasts, while a modified stanza from his 1970 song "" was used by Sveriges Utbildningsradio during long breaks between its educational television programming on Sveriges Television (SVT) in the late 1970s.

During the 1950s Lundsten built his own electronic musical instruments and was one of the first pioneers in this field.

He was awarded the Illis quorum in 2008.

Albums 
 1966 – . ('The electronic music studio')
 1967 – MUMS. 'Music beneath millions of stars'
 1968 –  (with Leo Nilson). 'Electronic music'
 1969 – . 'Tellus. Blue Bird'
 1969 – . 'Suite for electronic accordion'
 1970 – . 'Erik XIV and Carvings'
 1970 – . 'Beer forest'
 1971 –  'Nightmare'
 1972 – . 'Our Father'
 1973 – . 'The Water Sprite: Nordic Nature Symphony No. 1'
 1973 – . 'Horror and laughter, trips in unknown worlds'
 1975 – Shangri-La
 1975 – . 'Johannes and the Lady of the Woods: Nordic Nature Symphony No. 2'
 1976 – Cosmic Love
 1977 – Ralph Lundsten's Universe
 1978 – Discophrenia
 1979 – Alpha Ralpha Boulevard
 1980 – . 'Paradise Symphony'
 1981 – . 'A Midwinter Saga: Nordic Nature Symphony No. 3'
 1982 – The New Age
 1983 –  'A Summer Saga: Nordic Nature Symphony No. 4/Pop Age'
 1984 –  '(Bewitched: Nordic Nature Symphony No. 5)/Dreamscape'
 1985 –  (contains The Ages of Man). 'Welcome'
 1986 – Fantasia by Starlight –  (CD/LP/cassette published in Japan). 'Starry night fantasy'
 1986 – The Dream Master
 1990 –  (Max von Sydow reads Gustav Sandgren's story "", accompanied by Lundsten's music) 'Johannes and the lady of the woods'
 1992 – . 'Landscape of Dreams: Nordic Nature Symphony No. 6'
 1993 – Nordic Light
 1994 – The Joy of Being
 1995 – In Time and Space
 1996 – Inspiration—Sweden (contains "Landscape of Dreams" and "Our Father") (EMI Classics)
 1996 – . 'The Seasons: Nordic Nature Symphony No. 7'
 2002 – . 'A Vagabond of the Soul'
 2003 – Cosmic Phantazy
 2004 – . 'Pathways of the Mind'
 2005 – Like the wind my longing – Classic pearls 1972–2004
 2007 –  'Out in the Wide World':  (Latin: Symphony of Linnaeus), Out in the Wide World, In the early Days of Summer, Song of the Mermaids, A Summer Saga (first performance)
 2007 – Lovetopia
 2008 – Electronic Music from the 60s and 70s (a boxed set composed of four previously released CDs)
 2008 – Dance in the Endless Night
 2010 – I sagans värld
 2013 – River of Time
 2020 – I svunnen tid

References

External links 
 Andromeda Studio – Official web site (in Swedish).
 Ralph's going to take you to another dimension – An article from The Local with a video about the Andromeda Galaxy Embassy (in English).

Swedish composers
Swedish male composers
New-age musicians
1936 births
EMI Classics and Virgin Classics artists
Living people
Recipients of the Illis quorum